Heart Dance is a national digital radio station owned and operated by Global as a spin-off from Heart. The station broadcasts from studios at Leicester Square in London.

Launched on 21 June 2019, Heart Dance is a rolling music service playing club classics and old school dance hits from the 1980s onwards. The station has presenters at peak times but is mostly an automated service. Heart's Club Classics already airing Friday and Saturday evenings on the main Heart station will be simulcast with Heart Dance.

The station broadcasts nationally on Digital One DAB and online. On 7 October 2019, the station launched on Sky channel 0146 replacing Smooth Extra.

Presenters
 Toby Anstis (Heart Dance Breakfast, weekdays; Heart's Club Classics: Friday evening, simulcast with Heart)
 Pandora Christie (Heart's Club Classics: Saturday evening, simulcast with Heart)
 Lucy Horobin (Heart Dance Drivetime, weekdays; Saturday mid-morning)
Rezzy Ghadjar (Main Relief Presenter)

References

External links 

Dance
Global Radio
Radio stations established in 2019